The Collection is a 2002 compilation album by Ugly Kid Joe. It features a collection of the band's music from their former label Mercury Records. Like The Very Best of Ugly Kid Joe: As Ugly as It Gets, it does not contain any songs from Motel California, which was released on Castle Records.

Track listing
 Everything About You
 Cats in the Cradle
 Neighbour
 So Damn Cool
 Busy Bee
 Milkman's Son
 Candle Song 
 Cloudy Skies 
 VIP 
 Oompa 
 Goddam Devil 
 Madman 
 Panhandlin' Prince
 Funky Fresh Country Club 
 Same Side
 Don't Go
 C.U.S.T
 Slower Than Nowhere

2002 compilation albums
Ugly Kid Joe albums
Albums produced by Dave Fortman